Biřkov is a municipality and village in Klatovy District in the Plzeň Region of the Czech Republic. It has about 100 inhabitants.

Administrative parts
The village of Zderaz is an administrative part of Biřkov.

References

Villages in Klatovy District